Ciro Redondo is a municipality and town in the Ciego de Ávila Province of Cuba. It is located halfway between the cities of Ciego de Ávila and  Morón and was named after .

Demographics
In 2004, the municipality of Ciro Redondo had a population of 29,560.

See also
Ciro Redondo Municipal Museum
Municipalities of Cuba
List of cities in Cuba

References

External links

Populated places in Ciego de Ávila Province